Steve Hage (born 3 February 1954 in Sydney, Australia) was an Australian professional rugby league footballer.

A talented attacking forward from the Gold Coast was spotted by the then Canterbury committeeman Barry Nelson who signed him to the Canterbury Bulldogs in 1976.
Hage joined the Newtown Jets for one year in 1979, and then joined the Eastern Suburbs Roosters in 1980. Hage also represented N.S.W. in 1978.

References

External links
Hage Player Statistics

1954 births
Living people
Australian rugby league players
Canterbury-Bankstown Bulldogs players
Newtown Jets players
New South Wales rugby league team players
Sydney Roosters players
Rugby league second-rows
Rugby league props
Rugby league players from Sydney